Sander Fischer (born 23 September 1988) is a Dutch professional footballer who plays as a centre back for VV Capelle.

Club career
He formerly played for NAC Breda, SC Cambuur, FC Emmen, AGOVV, Excelsior, Go Ahead Eagles, and Sparta.

On 29 March 2021, he agreed to join VV Capelle in the fifth-tier Hoofdklasse for the 2021–22 season.

References

External links
 
 

1988 births
Living people
People from Albrandswaard
Association football central defenders
Dutch footballers
NAC Breda players
SC Cambuur players
FC Emmen players
AGOVV Apeldoorn players
Excelsior Rotterdam players
Go Ahead Eagles players
Sparta Rotterdam players
Vendsyssel FF players
VV Capelle players
Eerste Divisie players
Eredivisie players
Danish Superliga players
Vierde Divisie players
Footballers from South Holland